1 Samuel 30 is the thirtieth chapter of the First Book of Samuel in the Old Testament of the Christian Bible or the first part of the Books of Samuel in the Hebrew Bible. According to Jewish tradition, the book was attributed to the prophet Samuel, with additions by the prophets Gad and Nathan, but modern scholars view it as a composition of a number of independent texts of various ages from c. 630–540 BCE. This chapter contains the account of David's escape from Saul's repeated attempts to kill him. This is within a section comprising 1 Samuel 16 to 2 Samuel 5 which records the rise of David as the king of Israel.

Text
This chapter was originally written in the Hebrew language. It is divided into 31 verses.

Textual witnesses
Some early manuscripts containing the text of this chapter in Hebrew are of the Masoretic Text tradition, which includes the Codex Cairensis (895), Aleppo Codex (10th century), and Codex Leningradensis (1008). Fragments containing parts of this chapter in Hebrew were found among the Dead Sea Scrolls including 4Q51 (4QSam; 100–50 BCE) with extant verses 22–31.

Extant ancient manuscripts of a translation into Koine Greek known as the Septuagint (originally was made in the last few centuries BCE) include Codex Vaticanus (B; B; 4th century) and Codex Alexandrinus (A; A; 5th century).

Places 

Aroer

Besor
Bethel

Eshtemoa
Hebron
Hormah
Jattir
Jezreel

Ramoth

Ziklag

The Amalekites raid Ziklag (30:1–6)
While Saul battled the Philistines David returned to Ziklag only to find it burned by the Amalekites and its inhabitants carried away. The attack was probably in retaliation for David's raid on the Amalekites (1 Samuel 27:8, 10). David and his men lost their wives and families, causing great lamentation (verse 4) and even placing David in personal danger (verse 6).

Verse 1
Now when David and his men came to Ziklag on the third day, the Amalekites had made a raid against the Negeb and against Ziklag. They had overcome Ziklag and burned it with fire
" Negeb": means "south", referring to the southern part of Judah, and the adjacent country.<ref name=benson>Benson, Joseph. [http://biblehub.com/commentaries/benson/1_samuel/30.htm '’Commentary on the Old and New Testaments. 1 Samuel 30.] Accessed 9 Juli 2019.</ref>

Verse 2and had taken captive the women and those who were there, from small to great; they did not kill anyone, but carried them away and went their way."They did not kill anyone": Because all the men of war were away, the city could not provide any resistance, and because women and children were valuable to be sold as slaves, mainly to the neighboring Egypt, so nobody was killed. However, leaving their wives and families absolutely defenseless probably made the men so angry at David that they were ready to kill him.Ellicott, C. J. (Ed.) (1905). Ellicott's Bible Commentary for English Readers. 1 Samuel 30. London : Cassell and Company, Limited, [1905-1906] Online version: (OCoLC) 929526708. Accessed 28 April 2019.

David destroys the Amalekites (30:7–20)
One unique feature in the narrative is David's ability to consult YHWH, in contrast to Saul's illegal consultation at Endor. David 'strengthened himself in the LORD' (cf. 1 Samuel 23:16), contacted YHWH through Abiathar the priest and received a positive answer (verses 7–8), so he was encouraged to pursue the attackers. A providential meeting with an exhausted Egyptian, probably recognized from his clothing, provided David and his men instant information to the raiders of Ziklag, even  securing the service to guide them down to the Amalekite camp. In another coincidence David and his troops arrived just as the Amalekites were obliviously celebrating their victory with feasting, giving a good opportunity to revenge allowing only 400 camel riders to escape. The captured families were saved intact and their possession was reclaimed with more booty to collect. Moreover, David had avenged not only Ziklag but also other areas as mentioned in verse 14—the Negeb of the Cherethites in the southern area controlled by the Philistines, the Negeb of Caleb, which was around Hebron, as well as Judean areas, providing special bond with the people of the areas as described later in 2 Samuel 2:1–4, when David becomes king of Judah.

Verse 19And nothing of theirs was lacking, either small or great, sons or daughters, spoil or anything which they had taken from them; David recovered all.Through this victory David rescued all that the Amalekites had taken, his two wives, his men's wives, and all the children great and small, as well as all stuffs that were taken from Ziklag, so that nothing was missing. 

Dividing the spoils (30:21–31)
David's successful attack obtained so much booty that enabled him to hand over some as gifts to the people of Judah (verses 26–31). This act and his ruling on the suggestion made by 'worthless fellows' (verses 22–25) displayed David's readiness to assume the role of king. Thus, Saul's sparing the Amalekites led to his downfall, whereas David's successful attack led to his rise as a king who was obedient to God.

Verse 26Now when David came to Ziklag, he sent some of the spoil to the elders of Judah, to his friends, saying, “Here is a present for you from the spoil of the enemies of the Lord”—''
"Spoil": or "booty"

See also

Related Bible parts: 1 Samuel 27, 1 Samuel 28, 1 Samuel 29

Notes

References

Sources

Commentaries on Samuel

General

External links
 Jewish translations:
 Shmuel I - I Samuel - Chapter 30 (Judaica Press). Hebrew text and English translation [with Rashi's commentary] at Chabad.org
 Christian translations:
 Online Bible at GospelHall.org (ESV, KJV, Darby, American Standard Version, Bible in Basic English)
 1 Samuel chapter 30. Bible Gateway

30